Controlled designation of origin may refer to:
  (AOC) of France
  (DOC) of Portugal
  (DO) of Spain
  (DOC) of Italy
  (DOC) of Romania